Reigning champion Mary Browne won the singles tennis title of the 1913 U.S. Women's National Singles Championship by defeating Dorothy Green 6–2, 7–5 in the challenge round. Green had won the right to challenge Browne by defeating Edna Wildey 6–3, 6–4 in the final of the All Comers' competition. The event was played on outdoor grass courts and held at the Philadelphia Cricket Club in Wissahickon Heights, Chestnut Hill, Philadelphia in the United States, from June 9 through June 14, 1913.

Draw

Challenge round

All Comers' finals

References

1913 in tennis
1913
1913 in women's tennis
June 1913 sports events
1913 in American women's sports
Women's Singles
Chestnut Hill, Philadelphia
1910s in Philadelphia
1913 in sports in Pennsylvania
Women's sports in Pennsylvania